USS Pasadena was a  light cruiser of the United States Navy, which were built during World War II. The class was designed as a development of the earlier s, the size of which had been limited by the First London Naval Treaty. The start of the war led to the dissolution of the treaty system, but the dramatic need for new vessels precluded a new design, so the Clevelands used the same hull as their predecessors, but were significantly heavier. The Clevelands carried a main battery of twelve  guns in four three-gun turrets, along with a secondary armament of twelve  dual-purpose guns.

Design

Following the start of World War II in September 1939, Britain announced it would suspend the treaty for the duration of the conflict, a decision the US Navy quickly followed. Though still neutral, the United States recognized that war was likely and the urgent need for additional ships ruled out an entirely new design, so the Clevelands were a close development of the earlier s, the chief difference being the substitution of a two-gun  dual-purpose gun mount for one of the main battery  gun turrets.

The ship was powered by four General Electric steam turbines, each driving one propeller shaft, using steam provided by four oil-fired Babcock & Wilcox boilers. Her crew numbered 1285 officers and enlisted men.

The ship was armed with a main battery of twelve 6 in /47 caliber Mark 16 guns in four 3-gun turrets on the centerline. Two were placed forward in a superfiring pair; the other two turrets were placed aft of the superstructure in another superfiring pair. The secondary battery consisted of twelve  /38 caliber dual-purpose guns mounted in twin turrets. Two of these were placed on the centerline, one directly behind the forward main turrets and the other just forward of the aft turrets. Two more were placed abreast of the conning tower and the other pair on either side of the aft superstructure. Anti-aircraft defense consisted of twenty-four Bofors  guns in four quadruple and four double mounts and twenty-one Oerlikon  guns in single mounts.

The main battery turrets were protected with  faces and  sides and tops, and they were supported by barbettes 6 inches thick. Pasadenas conning tower had 5-inch sides.

Service history

The keel for Pasadena was laid down at the Fore River Shipyard on 6 February 1943. She was launched of 28 December, and was commissioned on 8 June 1944. After entering service, she carried out a shakedown cruise and initial training into September, before departing on 25 September to join American naval forces fighting in the Pacific Theater of World War II. She reached the Navy's forward operating base at Ulithi in mid-November, where she joined the Fast Carrier Task Force, then designated Task Force 38. Pasadena operated as part of the screen for the task force's aircraft carriers as they carried out a series of strikes against Japanese targets in the Philippines and Formosa to support the Philippines campaign. These operations carried on into 1945, and in January, the unit entered the South China Sea to strike Japanese installations in French Indochina and Formosa. Attacks on Japan itself followed in February, and then the carriers turned their attention to the invasion of Iwo Jima later that month. During the battle on that island, Pasadena took part in shore bombardment operations to support the marines fighting to secure it.

The Fast Carrier Task Force then returned to Ulithi to replenish stores and take on munitions before getting underway again in mid-March to begin the preparatory attacks on Okinawa in advance of the invasion of that island. These included air raids on the northern Ryukyu Islands and southern Japan to neutralize forces that would interfere with the planned landings. During this period, Pasadena served as the flagship of Cruiser Division 17, which carried out night bombardments of Minami Daito on 28 March and 10 May. Operations off Okinawa to support the forces that had gone ashore in April continued through the end of May, and in June, the Fast Carrier Task Force withdrew to Ulithi for another period of rest and replenishment. The ships sortied once again in early July to begin another round of attacks on the Japanese home islands; these attacks continued until mid-August, stopping only on 15 August when Japan indicated it would surrender unconditionally. Pasadena thereafter took part in the occupation of Japan; she became the flagship of Task Group 35.1 on 23 August, and four days later she dropped anchor in Sagami Bay outside Tokyo. On 1 September, she moved to Tokyo Bay in preparation for the formal surrender ceremony that took place the following day. In her relatively brief wartime career, Pasadena was awarded five battle stars.

Pasadena remained in Tokyo Bay through mid-January 1946, helping to oversee the occupation of the Japanese capital. She was recalled home on 19 January for an overhaul in San Pedro, California. After she emerged from the shipyard, she took part in training exercises in the area until September, when she sailed back to the central Pacific. She took part in divisional training exercises in Micronesia from November 1946 to February 1947, followed by fleet maneuvers off Hawaii, before returning to California. The year 1948 began with training maneuvers off California, followed by an NROTC training cruise. She made another voyage to East Asia on 1 October, which included a visit to Tsingtao, China, at the end of the month. She patrolled off the Chinese coast until May 1949, when she once again returned to California, arriving on 1 June. Over the following months, she took part in training exercises in the area before going to sea for the last time on 12 September, bound for Bremerton, Washington, where she was laid up in the Pacific Reserve Fleet. She was formally decommissioned on 12 January 1950. She remained there until 1970. She was stricken from the naval register on 1 December that year and thereafter discarded.

Footnotes

Notes

Citations

References

External links

 USN Ships--USS Pasadena (CL-65)—Online Library of Selected Images, Naval Historical Center

 

Cleveland-class cruisers
World War II cruisers of the United States
Ships built in Quincy, Massachusetts
1943 ships